Pterostylis furcata, commonly known as the forked greenhood, is a species of orchid endemic to Tasmania. Flowering plants have a rosette of bright green leaves at the base of the flowering stem and a single green and white flower with the tip of the dorsal sepal pointing above the horizontal.

Description
Pterostylis furcata is a terrestrial, perennial, deciduous, herb with an underground tuber. The dorsal sepal and petals are fused, forming a hood or "galea" over the column but the dorsal sepal is longer than the petals, has a sharp point on its end and points slightly upwards. There is a wide gap between the lateral sepals and the galea, and there is a curved, deeply notched sinus between them. Flowering occurs from November to February.

Taxonomy and naming
Pterostylis furcata was first formally described in 1840 by John Lindley from a specimen collected in Tasmania and the description was published in The Genera and Species of Orchidaceous Plants. The specific epithet (furcata) is a Latin word meaning "forked".

Distribution and habitat
The forked greenhood grows in wet forest and in montane grassland in Tasmania.

References

furcata
Endemic orchids of Australia
Orchids of Tasmania
Plants described in 1840